Andrzej Marusarz (3 August 1913 – 5 October 1968) was a Polish ski jumper. He competed at the 1932 Winter Olympics and the 1936 Summer Olympics.

References

1913 births
1968 deaths
Polish male ski jumpers
Polish male Nordic combined skiers
Olympic ski jumpers of Poland
Olympic Nordic combined skiers of Poland
Ski jumpers at the 1932 Winter Olympics
Ski jumpers at the 1936 Winter Olympics
Nordic combined skiers at the 1932 Winter Olympics
Nordic combined skiers at the 1936 Winter Olympics
Sportspeople from Zakopane
20th-century Polish people